Loree Marlowe Moore (born March 21, 1983) is a former professional basketball player for the New York Liberty in the WNBA.

Moore started at the point guard position for the Liberty and wore jersey number 12.  She has also played professional basketball in Turkey and Russia.

Moore was selected as the tenth overall pick in the 2005 WNBA Draft. She attended the University of Tennessee, and played under Hall of Fame coach Pat Summitt.

Born in Carson, California, Moore graduated from Narbonne High School in Harbor City, California. Moore was named a WBCA All-American. She participated in the 2001 WBCA High School All-America Game, where she scored eight points, and earned MVP honors. She is the younger sister of former Major League Baseball player Brian Hunter.

Tennessee statistics
Source

USA Basketball
Moore was a member of the USA Women's U18 team which won the gold medal at the FIBA Americas Championship in Mar Del Plata, Argentina. The event was held in July 2000, when the USA team defeated Cuba to win the championship. Moore averaged 6.0 points per game in her three games.

Moore was named to the USA Women's U19 team which represented the USA in the 2001 U19 World's Championship, held in Brno, Czech Republic in July 2001. Moore scored 3.1 points per game, and helped the USA team to a 6–1 record and the bronze medal.

Moore was named to the team representing the USA at the 2003 Pan American Games. The team lost the opening game to Cuba, then rebounded to win their next five games, including an overtime win against Brazil. They won a close game against Canada, 56–53, helped by a game saving steal by Moore with seconds left in the game. They then faced Cuba for the gold medal, falling short 75–64 to take home the silver medal. Moore averaged 6.4 points per game.

European career
 2006–2007:  Galatasaray
 2007–2009:  Chevakata Vologda

Notes

External links
WNBA player profile
Tennessee Lady Vols player profile

1983 births
Living people
American expatriate basketball people in Russia
American expatriate basketball people in Turkey
American women's basketball players
Basketball players at the 2003 Pan American Games
Galatasaray S.K. (women's basketball) players
New York Liberty draft picks
New York Liberty players
Pan American Games medalists in basketball
Pan American Games silver medalists for the United States
People from Carson, California
Point guards
Shooting guards
Tennessee Lady Volunteers basketball players
Medalists at the 2003 Pan American Games
United States women's national basketball team players